Teenage Mutant Ninja Turtles II: Back from the Sewers, released as Teenage Mutant Hero Turtles II: Back from the Sewers in Europe, and Teenage Mutant Ninja Turtles 2 in Japan, is a 1991 Game Boy game by Konami. It is the sequel to Teenage Mutant Ninja Turtles: Fall of the Foot Clan. The game was re-released as part of Teenage Mutant Ninja Turtles: The Cowabunga Collection in 2022.

Gameplay
Similar to Fall of the Foot Clan, the previous Game Boy game in the series, the player can switch between turtles before each stage. Each turtle has his own strengths and weaknesses. Donatello has a long range of attack, but attacks slowly, Raphael's attack is fast but has a very short range, and Leonardo and Michaelangelo are well-balanced. When a turtle is defeated, he becomes captured by the enemy. The game is over when all turtles are captured. After completing a stage, the player is given the opportunity to rescue a captured turtle by defeating REX-1 in a bonus stage. If no turtles were captured, the player enters a bonus stage instead.

The game features several gameplay elements besides the typical beat-em-ups like dodging huge boulders in the underground levels, going around on skateboards or scaling air lifts, and the game also shifts from being typical 2D just walking left and right to a more open area where the turtles can walk all over the screen. The bosses of the game are the standard villains: Bebop and Rocksteady, Baxter Stockman, General Traag, Granitor The Stone Warrior, Pizza Monsters (Sub Boss), Krang in his walker mech, Shredder, and Super Shredder (Sub Boss), though just like Fall of the Foot Clan, Krang in his robot body serves as the final boss. The game has several difficulty settings which, depending on the level, make more powerful enemies appear or even give the bosses extra attacks.

Reception

GamePro gave Back from the Sewers an overall rating of 5 out of 5 in their December 1991 review.

References

External links

1991 video games
Game Boy games
Konami games
Platform games
Side-scrolling video games
Video game sequels
Back from the Sewers
Video games set in New York City
Video games scored by Tsuyoshi Sekito
Video games developed in Japan